"Family Tree" is a song recorded by American country music artist Darryl Worley.  It was released in October 2002 as the second single from the album I Miss My Friend.  The song reached #26 on the Billboard Hot Country Singles & Tracks chart.  The song was written by Darrell Scott.

Chart performance

References

2002 singles
2002 songs
Darryl Worley songs
Songs written by Darrell Scott
Song recordings produced by Frank Rogers (record producer)
Song recordings produced by James Stroud
DreamWorks Records singles